Crofton is a surname. Notable people with the surname include:

 Anne Crofton, 1st Baroness Crofton (1751–1817), Irish peeress in her own right
 C. S. F. Crofton (1873–1909), British philatelist and a member of the Indian Civil Service
 Eileen Crofton (1919-2010), Scottish physician, anti-smoking campaigner and author
 Edward Crofton (disambiguation), several people
 Guy Crofton, 7th Baron Crofton (1951–2007), Anglo-Irish officer in the British Army
 Professor Sir John Crofton (1912–2009), Anglo-Irish physician, pioneer in the treatment of tuberculosis
 Kathleen Crofton (died 1982), English dancer, dance director and dance teacher
 Meg Crofton (born 1953), American businesswoman, president of Walt Disney World Resort
 Morgan Crofton (1826–1915), Irish mathematician
 Patrick Crofton (1935–2016), Canadian politician
 Sir Walter Crofton (1815–1897), Anglo-Irish prison administrator and penal reformer
 Zachary Crofton (1626–1672), Anglo-Irish nonconforming minister and controversialist